Anita Erskine-Amaizo  (born Vered - Marian Anita Erskine; 3 December 1978) is a bilingual (English and French) Ghanaian broadcaster, professional compère, talk show host, actress and girls’ education advocate. She is the Executive Producer and host of  Sheroes of Our Time, which airs on Akwaaba Magic on DSTV. She is also the Host and an Advisor of the 2020 edition of the Africa Netpreneur Prize Initiative (Jack Ma Foundation's flagship philanthropic entrepreneur program in Africa).

Early life and education
Anita was born in Jerusalem, Israel to former Ghanaian soldier and politician, Lieutenant General Emmanuel Erskine and Rose Anastasia Erskine. She was raised in Ghana and in late teens moved to Canada. She had her Primary Education at Christ the King International School and her Secondary Education at Ghana International School. Erskine holds a bachelor's degree in Cultural Studies from Trent University in Peterborough, Ontario Canada.

Career
Anita's first TV show appearance on Ghanaian TV was in 1998 when she hosted the Bold and Beautiful Omnibus Talk Show on Metro TV. In Canada she worked as an administrative assistant and then a radio show host at FLOW 93.5 in Toronto. In 2006, she became the host of  TV3's Mentor. After an audition in 2007, she became the Ghanaian correspondent for MNET's Studio 53. Later In 2009, while on maternity leave, she started to work at Viasat 1 in Ghana as the Lead  Producer for the station's own programming. Upon her exit from Viasat 1 and Modern African Productions, she became the host of Ifactory Live's Pamper Your Mum, Cooking With and Making of a Mogul.

Between 2007 and early 2009, Anita was the Corporate Communications Director of Tigo (owned by Millicom), taking roles in Ghana and the Democratic Republic of Congo.

She came back to Viasat 1 to "The One Show" in 2014. At the same time, she also hosted +233 Discovery which was developed by the Discovery Learning Alliance - now Impact Ed International.

In 2015, she became the co host for Accra - based Starr FM's "Starr Drive" with Bola Ray and then with Giovanni Caleb. She resigned from the group in November 2017 to focus on building her advocacy and production company.

She founded her Communications Consultancy, Anita Erskine Media in June 2016 and built one subsidiary called Bosslady Productions. She runs the Anita Erskine Media.

Awards 

 100 Most Influential Women in Africa 
 100 Most Inspirational Women in Ghana 
 100 Most Influential People in Ghana 
 POWER INFLUENCER : Who is Who in Ghana 
 Radio and TV Personality (RTP) — Radio Female Presenter of the Year (2017)
 Outstanding Contribution To Women Empowerment - 40 under 40 2017
 Protector of Women and Girl Child Rights Award - African Women Intercultural Dialogue 2017
 Women Mean Business Honors - Legendary Award Winner - 2016
 TV Hostess of the Year - City People Awards - 2015
 TV Female Entertainment Host of the Year 2014 - Radio and TV Personality (RTP)
 Best Supporting Actress  - Ghana Movie Awards 2012
Best  Actress- Ghana Movie Awards 2013
Best Supporting Actress - Ghana Movie Awards 2014

References

Living people
1978 births
Trent University alumni
Ghanaian television presenters
Ghanaian women television presenters
Ghanaian journalists
Ghanaian women journalists